The following outline is provided as an overview of and topical guide to Uttarakhand:

Uttarakhand – state in the northern part of India. It is often referred to as the Devabhumi (literally: "Land of the Gods") due to many Hindu temples and pilgrimage centres found throughout the state. Uttarakhand is known for its natural environment of the Himalayas, the Bhabar and Terai.

General reference

Names 
 Common English name(s): Uttarakhand
 Pronunciation: 
 Official English name(s): Uttarakhand
 Nickname(s): Devabhumi ("Land of the Gods")
 Adjectival(s): Uttarakhandi
 Demonym(s): Uttarakhandi

Rankings (amongst States and Union Territories of India) 

 by area: 19th
 by elevation: 2nd
 by population (2011): 21st
 by population density (2011): 27th
 by gross domestic product (GDP nominal) (2017–18): 19th
 by gross domestic product (GDP nominal) per capita: 9th
by Human Development Index (HDI) (2017): 19th
 by life expectancy at birth (2010–2014): 3rd
 by sex ratio: 14th
 by literacy rate (2011): 17th

Geography of Uttarakhand 

 Geography of Uttarakhand
 Uttarakhand is: a State of India
 Population of Uttarakhand: 10,116,752
 Area of Uttarakhand:  53,483 km²
 Atlas of Uttarakhand

Environment of Uttarakhand 

 Environment and Forests Department

Ecoregions of Uttarakhand 

 Western Himalayan alpine shrub and meadows
 Western Himalayan subalpine conifer forests
 Himalayan subtropical pine forests
 Western Himalayan broadleaf forests
 Himalayan subtropical broadleaf forests
 Terai-Duar savanna and grasslands
 Upper Gangetic Plains moist deciduous forests

Natural geographic features of Uttarakhand 

 Great Himalayas
 Garhwal Himalayas
 Sivalik Hills
 Bhabar
 Terai
 Doab
 Indo-Gangetic Plain
 Ganges Basin
 Mountains peaks of Uttarakhand
 Lakes of Kumaon hills

Location of Uttarakhand 
 Uttarakhand is situated within the following regions:
 Northern Hemisphere
 Eastern Hemisphere
 Eurasia
 Asia
 South Asia
 Indian subcontinent
 India
 North India
 Time zone:  Indian Standard Time (UTC+05:30)

Regions of Uttarakhand

Administrative divisions of Uttarakhand 

 Administrative divisions of Uttarakhand
 Districts of Uttarakhand
 Tehsils of Uttarakhand
 Community development blocks of Uttarakhand
 Urban local bodies of Uttarakhand

Districts of Uttarakhand, by division 

 Kumaon division
 Almora district
 Bageshwar district
 Champawat district
 Nainital district
 Pithoragarh district
 Udham Singh Nagar district
 Garhwal division
 Chamoli district
 Dehradun district
 Haridwar district
 Pauri Garhwal district
 Rudraprayag district
 Tehri Garhwal district
 Uttarkashi district

Districts of Uttarakhand, by division 

 Kumaon division
 Almora district
 Bageshwar district
 Champawat district
 Nainital district
 Pithoragarh district
 Udham Singh Nagar district
 Garhwal division
 Chamoli district
 Dehradun district
 Haridwar district
 Pauri Garhwal district
 Rudraprayag district
 Tehri Garhwal district
 Uttarkashi district

Districts of Uttarakhand, by division 

 Kumaon division
 Almora district
 Bageshwar district
 Champawat district
 Nainital district
 Pithoragarh district
 Udham Singh Nagar district
 Garhwal division
 Chamoli district
 Dehradun district
 Haridwar district
 Pauri Garhwal district
 Rudraprayag district
 Tehri Garhwal district
 Uttarkashi district

Municipalities of Uttarakhand 

 Municipal Corporations of Uttarakhand
 Dehradun
 Haridwar
 Haldwani
 Roorkee
 Rudrapur
 Kashipur
 Rishikesh
 Kotdwar

Demographics of Uttarakhand 

List of cities in Uttarakhand by population

People of Uttarakhand 

 People from Uttarakhand
 Indo-Aryan people
 Pahari people
 Garhwali people
 Kumaoni people
 Jaunsari people
 Khas people
 Buksa people
 Tharu people
 Tibeto-Burman people
 Bhotiya people
 Raji people
 Jad people
 Banrawat people

Languages of Uttarakhand 

 Indo-Aryan languages
 Northern Indo-Aryan languages
 Garhwali language
 Kumaoni language
 Jaunsari language
 Eastern Indo-Aryan languages
 Tharu languages
 Tibeto-Burman languages
 West Himalayish languages
 Rongpo language
 Byangsi language
 Chaudangsi language
 Darmiya language
 Greater Magaric languages
 Raji language
 Rawat language
 Bodish languages
 Jad language

Government and politics of Uttarakhand 

 Form of government: state government (parliamentary system of representative democracy)
 Capitals of Uttarakhand:
 Gairsain (Summer)
 Dehradun (Winter)
 Elections in Uttarakhand
 Uttarakhand State Election Commission
 Local body elections in Uttarakhand

Branches of the government of Uttarakhand 

 Government of Uttarakhand

Executive branch of the government of Uttarakhand 

 Head of state: Governor of Uttarakhand
 Head of government: Chief Minister of Uttarakhand
 Cabinet: Uttarakhand Council of Ministers

Legislative branch of the government of Uttarakhand 

 Uttarakhand Legislative Assembly
 Speaker of the Uttarakhand Legislative Assembly
 Leader of the Opposition in the Uttarakhand Legislative Assembly
 Constituencies of the Uttarakhand Legislative Assembly

Judicial branch of the government of Uttarakhand 

 Uttarakhand High Court
 Chief Justice of the Uttarakhand High Court
 Seat: Nainital

Law and order in Uttarakhand 

 Uttarakhand Police

Government agencies in Uttarakhand

 Uttarakhand Public Service Commission
 Uttarakhand Human Rights Commission

History of Uttarakhand 

 History of Uttarakhand

History of Uttarakhand, by period

Ancient Uttarakhand 
 Uttarakuru Kingdom
 Paurava Kingdom
 Khasa Kingdom
 Kirata Kingdom
 Nanda Empire
 Maurya Empire
 Kushan Empire
 Kuninda Kingdom
 Gupta Empire

Medieval Uttarakhand 
 Karkota Empire
 
 Garhwal Kingdom
 Panwar dynasty
 Kumaon Kingdom
 Katyuri dynasty
 Chand dynasty
 Raika Kingdom
 Malla Kingdom
 Gorkha Kingdom
 Shah dynasty
 Anglo-Nepalese War
 Treaty of Sugauli

Colonial Uttarakhand 
 Company rule
 Ceded and Conquered Provinces
 North Western Provinces
 Agra Presidency
 British rule
 United Provinces of Agra and Oudh
 United Provinces of British India
 United Provinces
 Coolie-Begar movement

Contemporary Uttarakhand 
 Uttarakhand movement
 Chipko movement
 Rampur Tiraha firing case
 Uttar Pradesh Reorganisation Act, 2000 – law that led to the formation of the State of Uttarakhand.

History of Uttarakhand, by region 

 History of Dehradun

Culture of Uttarakhand 

 Monuments in Uttarakhand
 Monuments of National Importance in Uttarakhand
 State Protected Monuments in Uttarakhand
 World Heritage Sites in Uttarakhand
 Nanda Devi and Valley of Flowers National Parks

Art in Uttarakhand 
 Music of Uttarakhand
 Cuisine of Uttarakhand

Sports in Uttarakhand 

 Cricket in Uttarakhand
 Uttarakhand cricket team
 Football in Uttarakhand
 Uttarakhand football team
 Uttarakhand Super League

Symbols of Uttarakhand 

 Symbols of Uttarakhand
 state emblem: Diamond Shield
 state song: Uttarakhand Devabhumi Matribhumi
 state animal: Alpine Musk Deer
 state bird: Himalayan Monal
 state flower: Brahma Kamal
 state tree: Burans

Economy and infrastructure of Uttarakhand 

 Economy of Uttarakhand
 Tourism in Uttarakhand
 Chota Char Dham
 State Industrial Development Corporation of Uttarakhand

Infrastructure of Uttarakhand 
 Uttarakhand Transport Corporation
 Char Dham Highway
 Char Dham Railway
 Urban Development Directorate

Education in Uttarakhand 

 Education in Uttarakhand
 Institutions of higher education in Uttarakhand
 Uttarakhand Board of School Education

See also 

 Outline of India

References

External links 

 of Uttarakhand government
 of Uttarakhand Tourism Development Board

Resources on Uttarakhand – news, policies, documents, articles
Photos of the massive destruction due to floods, Uttarakhand
Uttarakhand Tourism, a comprehensive guide

.
Uttarakhand
Uttarakhand